Pubsoft is a cloud-based eBook publishing platform headquartered in Houston, Texas. It serves as the publishing engine for Kbuuk, LLC,  a self-publishing software company that provides digital conversion, distribution and marketing services for authors.  Pubsoft is designed to allow publishers to create and manage an online eBook store  for direct consumer sales. Publishers can also use Pubsoft to handle social media marketing, deliver eBooks to mobile devices, manage author and reader relationships and distribute royalties through an administrative portal that uses PayPal.

The Pubsoft system also provides book-level analytics designed to help publishers and authors move toward data-driven publishing. Originally designed for the trade publishing sector, the Pubsoft system is currently used for a variety of applications by agencies, education and creative writing programs, enterprises, industry experts and religious organizations. 

Pubsoft allows companies to manage content by uploading documents and converting them to EPUB 3.0 eBooks, which can then be read in a web browser or on an iOS device. Through the Pubsoft backend system, an administrator or instructor can then evaluate reading progress and engagement, as well as assess reading comprehension through customized quizzes.

History 

Pubsoft was founded and launched in 2012 by CEO Isaac Shi and COO Dougal Cameron.

Technology 

Pubsoft is a multi-tenant software-as-a-service (SaaS) eBook publishing platform  that is designed to support digital publishing industry standard EPUB 3.0, an XML-based eBook content standard. Pubsoft utilizes a Model View Controller (MVC) design pattern, and the system contains three layers: a database layer created in MySQL, a business logic layer built on a Zend framework and a responsive user interface  layer created with HTML5 and CSS3.

As an enterprise-grade application, the Pubsoft database is built on a relationship schema compatible with Boyce-Codd Normal Form (BCNF), which is designed to ensure scalability, reliability and data integrity.

The Pubsoft SaaS application is deployed on Amazon Elastic Compute Cloud and Amazon Relational Database Service.

References 

Book publishing in the United States